The Ansted-Lexington, also known as the Ansted, was an American automobile manufactured in 1922.  The Ansted-Lexington was a custom-designed Lexington roadster marketed under the Ansted emblem, sporting an Ansted six as its engine.  The sports car was luxuriously appointed, and cost $4,500.

Vintage vehicles
Defunct motor vehicle manufacturers of the United States
Motor vehicle manufacturers based in Indiana
Defunct companies based in Indiana